Mleh may refer to:

 Mleh, Prince of Armenia (before 1120 – 1170)
 Melias (died 934), Byzantine general, founder of the theme of Lykandos